Conspiracy of Beards, based in San Francisco, California, is a 30+/- member a cappella male choir performing exclusively the songs of Leonard Cohen. Inspired by late artist Peter Kadyk and directed by Daryl Henline, the group performs gritty, original arrangements of Cohen's songs.

Started in June 2003 by Daryl Henline and Patrick Kadyk, the group has performed to audiences around the San Francisco Bay Area including the San Francisco Museum of Modern Art, Cafe du Nord and the Great American Music Hall. The choir has also been featured on Neighborhood Public Radio's  West Coast Live, on KFOG-FM, on Public Broadcasting Service (PBS) Public television station KQED (TV), on KQED-FM The California Report, and on National Public Radio (NPR) Weekend Edition. In March 2008 the choir released a recording to coincide with their performance tour in New York City. In 2011 Conspiracy of Beards had the honor of performing at the Hardly Strictly Bluegrass Festival. In 2012 they sang to sold-out crowds at the Highline Ballroom, Jack Hanley Gallery, and Glasslands Gallery on their New York tour. In June 2012 Conspiracy of Beards embarked on Pacific Northwest bus tour and performed their first international show in Vancouver Canada. The 2012/2013 season brings the choirs 10th anniversary.

Discography

Albums
 Conspiracy of Beards (2008)

DVDs
 A Midnight Choir (2012)

References

External links 

Official Conspiracy of Beards Website
Videos by Conspiracy of Beards
Conspiracy of Beards on Facebook
Conspiracy of Beards on Twitter
Out of Round Records Website

Choirs in the San Francisco Bay Area
2003 establishments in California
Leonard Cohen
Musical groups established in 2003